Capitalizing on Roberta Flack's comeback success with the hit duet, "Tonight I Celebrate My Love," K-tel Records released Greatest Hits in 1984.  It contained the 1983 duet with Peabo Bryson as well as some of her best-known songs from the 1970s.

Track listing 
 "Tonight, I Celebrate My Love"
 performed by Roberta Flack & Peabo Bryson
 "Feel Like Makin' Love"
 "Killing Me Softly with His Song"
 "You've Got a Friend"
 performed by Roberta Flack & Donny Hathaway
 "The Closer I Get To You"
 performed by Roberta Flack & Donny Hathaway
 "Will You Still Love Me Tomorrow"
 "Maybe"
 performed by Roberta Flack & Peabo Bryson
 "Where Is the Love"
 performed by Roberta Flack & Donny Hathaway
 "The First Time Ever I Saw Your Face"
 "Jesse"
 "If I Ever See You Again"
 "You're Lookin' Like Love to Me"
 performed by Roberta Flack & Peabo Bryson
 "Don't Make Me Wait Too Long"
 "You Are My Heaven"
 performed by Roberta Flack & Donny Hathaway
 "Heaven Above Me"
 performed by Roberta Flack & Peabo Bryson
 "Back Together Again"
 performed by Roberta Flack & Donny Hathaway

1984 greatest hits albums
Roberta Flack albums